is a Japanese baseball-themed manga series written and illustrated by Mitsuru Adachi. It was serialized in Shogakukan shōnen manga magazine Weekly Shōnen Sunday from April 2005 to February 2010, with its chapters collected in 17 tankōbon volumes. The series was adapted as a 50-episode anime television series that aired on the TV Tokyo network from April 2009 to March 2010.

Cross Game is the story of Ko Kitamura and the four neighboring Tsukishima sisters, Ichiyo, Wakaba, Aoba, and Momiji. Wakaba and Ko were born on the same day in the same hospital and are close enough that Wakaba treats Ko as her boyfriend, though nothing is officially declared, while Aoba, one year younger than them, hates how Ko is "taking" her sister away from her. After Wakaba dies in an accident, Ko and Aoba slowly grow closer as they strive to fulfill Wakaba's final dream of seeing them play in the high school baseball championship in Koshien Stadium. The manga is divided into multiple parts. Part One, which consists of volume one, is a prologue that takes place while the main characters are in elementary school, ending in tragedy. Part Two starts four years later with Ko in his third year of junior high and continues into the summer of his third year of high school. Part Three continues the story without a break, ending with Ko and Aoba traveling to Koshien.

In 2009, Cross Game received the 54th Shogakukan Manga Award for the shōnen category. Both the manga and its anime adaptation have been overall well received by critics.

Plot

At the start of Part One, Ko Kitamura, son of the owner of Kitamura Sports, lives in the same neighborhood as the batting center run by the Tsukishima family. Due to their proximity and the relationship between their businesses, the Kitamura and Tsukishima families have been close for many years, and their children go back and forth between the two homes. Because Ko and Wakaba are the same age and always together, Aoba is jealous of all the time Ko spends with her older sister. Aoba is a natural pitcher with excellent form, and Ko secretly trains to become as good as she is, even while publicly showing little interest in baseball. Then Wakaba dies in a swimming accident at a summer camp during fifth grade.

Part Two starts with Ko in his third year of junior high, as he continues training in secret. When he enters Seishu High School, he joins the baseball club along with his childhood friends, Akaishi and Nakanishi. However, the interim principal (the regular principal is on medical leave) has brought in a new head coach, and he in turn brings in transfer students from other schools as ringers just to play baseball. This team, led by their star, Yūhei Azuma, is the clear favorite of the school. Because the three friends refuse to take evaluation tests to join the first-string team, they are placed on the second-string "portable" team under the former head coach, Maeno, who has to use the Seishu Junior High School field for practice. This causes a rivalry between the two parts of the team. In the first summer practice scrimmage between them, the portable team loses by only a narrow margin.

During the summer vacation, while the first-string team plays in the prefectural qualifying tournament for Koshien, Maeno has the portable team practice at a recently closed elementary school with the support from a mysterious old man. The portable team also has six practice matches with other local high schools, all of which reached semifinals or higher in the regional preliminaries. Near the end of summer vacation, the interim principal decides to dissolve the portable team. However, Coach Maeno asks for a rematch scrimmage with the first-string team, after which the losing team would be dissolved and that coach would leave. The portable team, playing with Aoba, wins a narrow victory. The first-string team is dissolved, and the head coach and the interim principal leave to work at other schools.

In the spring, Ko becomes a second-year student and Aoba enters Seishu High School. Yūhei, who stays at Seishu despite having been on the former first-string team, moves in with Ko's family after the first-stringers' dormitory is closed. The reformed Seishu team goes on to prove themselves by defeating Sannō High School in the first round of the summer prefectural qualifying tournament. However, they lose to their second-round opponents, Ryuō, in overtime, ending Seishu's hopes of Koshien for the year. Ryuō subsequently reaches Koshien, advances up to the semifinals where they are narrowly beaten. However, Ryuō then goes on to win the spring invitational Koshien tournament later that same year.

As Ko and Aoba enter their summer break, a girl named Akane Takigawa with a striking resemblance to Wakaba moves in next door to Ko. This causes mixed feelings among the various characters, particularly Ko, Aoba, and Akaishi (who had also liked Wakaba). Akane soon becomes friends with Ko and Tsukishimas, and begins working in the Tsukishima cafe. As another year begins, the romantic subplots further solidify when Yūhei expresses an interest in Aoba. Meanwhile, Seishu gains a new assistant coach in the form of Yūhei's older brother Junpei, after Ichiyo agrees to marry him if Seishu makes it to Koshien.

When the prefectural summer baseball tournament starts, Seishu starts with a dominating shutout against its first-round opponent, Matsunami Municipal High School. In the second round, they face Sena Municipal High School led by Tatsumasa Miki, a former Seishu first-string player, which in the first round defeated the team headed by Seishu's former head coach. Seishu wins with a nearly perfect game, ending Part Two of the story.

Part Three starts with the prefectural tournament still in progress. After another win by Seishu, Akane is hospitalized due to an unspecified illness. Initially, Akaishi's play is affected by worrying about Akane's condition. Ko continues to perform well and promises Akane to go on a date with her if Seishu reaches Koshien. However, Akane's illness is more severe than expected, and she is scheduled for surgery on the morning of the prefectural final against Ryuō. Before the game begins, Ko tells Aoba he loves her more than anyone, but in such a way she thinks he is lying until after Seishu wins in extra innings, clinching a Koshien berth. In the final chapter, the morning before traveling to Koshien, Akaishi visits Akane recovering in the hospital and Ko and Aoba head for the train station holding hands.

Media

Manga

Cross Game, written and illustrated by Mitsuru Adachi, was serialized in Shogakukan's shōnen manga magazine Weekly Shōnen Sunday from April 27, 2005, to February 17, 2010. The series is divided into multiple parts. Part One, "Wakaba's Season", consists of volume one, and takes place while the main characters are in elementary school. Part Two, "Aoba's Season", covering volumes 2 through 14, with chapter numbering restarted from 1, begins four years later with Ko in his third year of junior high school and continues into high school. In October 2008, the series went on hiatus at the end of Part Two, resuming in March 2009 with the start of Part Three, which is untitled and covers volumes 15 through 17, with Ko in the summer of his third year of high school. Shogakukan collected its 160 individual chapters in seventeen tankōbon volumes, released from September 2, 2005, to April 16. 2010.

The series is licensed in France by Editions Tonkam, in Italy by Flashbook Editore, in South Korea by Daiwon C.I., in Hong Kong by Jonesky, in Taiwan by Chingwin Publishing Group, in Indonesia by Elex Media Komputindo, and in Thailand by Vibulkij Publishing.

In March 2010, Viz Media announced that they had licensed the series for release in North America. The first volume, collecting the first three tankōbon volumes, was published October 12, 2010. The eighth and final volume was released on November 13, 2012.

Anime

Cross Game was adapted into an anime television series produced by TV Tokyo, Shogakukan-Shueisha Productions and SynergySP. It was directed by Osamu Sekita, with Michihiro Tsuchiya handling series composition, Yūji Kondō designing the characters and Kotaro Nakagawa composing the music. The series aired on the TV Tokyo network beginning on April 5, 2009 in the 10:00–10:30 am slot; episodes began syndication later in April 2009 on AT-X and other channels in Japan, and finished airing on March 28, 2010.  The first DVD volume of episodes was released in Japan on July 24, 2009, with additional DVDs released monthly.

The opening theme song, "Summer Rain", was written by Kentarō Kobuchi and sung by Kobukuro. It was released by Warner Music Japan on April 15, 2009 in both regular and limited edition versions, and peak ranked at #2 on the Oricon singles chart. The ending theme song for episodes 1–13, was composed and sung by Ayaka and arranged by Shintarō Tokita. It was released as a single by Warner Music Japan in both regular and limited edition versions on April 22, 2009, and reached #6 on the Oricon singles chart. The ending theme for episodes 14–26,  by Squarehood, was released as a single by Warner Music Japan on August 5, 2009.

Viz began streaming the Cross Game anime in the United States in May 2010.

Reception
Cross Game won the 54th Shogakukan Manga Award for the shōnen category in 2009. The first volume of the French edition won the Prix Tam-Tam Dlire Manga 2007. The manga was also used in an academic paper presented at the 2007 conference of the International Research Society for Children's Literature as an example of telling a story using "silent" scenes (scenes with no dialogue) to powerfully convey a message.

The first two volumes of the Japanese edition were described by Anime News Network as "quietly brilliant" and "the slice-of-life genre at its best", saying that despite some "storytelling goofs", there is "no matching the pleasant feelings that come from reading this series." The French edition was praised by Manga News as a "great success" and "a pure delight as usual," citing as key ingredients the "appealing and funny characters" put in funny situations, accessible drawing style, and Adachi's talent for staging baseball scenes; Adachi was praised for his ability to mix "the sports world which he cherishes so much and the love relationships that are not yet real but so much implied and awaited" and his skill at rendering moving scenes without dialogue. The reviewer noted that while Adachi's art style has not changed much since Touch, his layouts are cleaner and his action scenes more dynamic than before. Anime Land praised Adachi for his "sense of the elliptical and staging", the verisimilitude of his stories, appealing secondary characters, and ability to develop comedy in just one panel. The reviewer claimed Adachi's handling of Wakaba's death is "remarkable" and that the event "gave real meaning" to the story.

The first episode of the anime series was called the "masterpiece of the new season" by ANN, which also complimented the musical score as "understated but highly effective". Two reviewers at ANN gave it the highest possible rating, and one said that he would have given it a higher rating if possible. Another praised its "honest and heartfelt storytelling" while saying it would be easy to call the episode's pacing "almost too-languid". A fourth reviewer found it to be typical of Adachi anime adaptations, but that the production values were "at best, mediocre and, at times, brushing up against the marginal".

Chris Beveridge of Mania.com, after viewing the first episode, said the series had "an older feeling to it" because of the rounder character designs reminiscent of those from the 1980s and 1990s, calling it a "great look" with a "wonderful simplicity" and backgrounds "filled with detail". Beveridge called the animation "solid", and stated that the series had "a whole lot of potential", making him excited to see more. He was impressed with the way the events of episode one were handled in the second episode, comparing the pacing and style to that of Kimagure Orange Road, which he stated is one of his favorites series. He especially liked the way the budding romance was shown between Ko and Wakaba back in the elementary school days, and how it affected the current relationship between Ko and Aoba.

Beveridge called the third episode "understated", moving at a slower pace which helps to begin showing the true nature of several of the characters, and the good pacing continues into the fourth episode where a dynamic between Akaishi, Nakanishi, and Ko is developed. Beveridge praised the character building in the fifth episode, calling the interaction of Ko and Aoba "very charming" and "reminiscent of real childhoods", with things "starting to fall into place" for the main focus of the series (high school baseball) by the end of the sixth episode. He praises the exposition used in the seventh episode, the protective instinct of Ko, Nakanishi, and Akaishi when it comes to Aoba, the use of flashbacks which show how the past is affecting the characters in the present, and the good pacing which "really sets it apart from almost every other sports show".

References

External links
 Cross Game manga official Shogakukan site 
 Cross Game manga official Shonen Sunday site
 Cross Game anime official TV Tokyo site 
 Cross Game anime official ShoPro site 
 Cross Game anime official Viz site
 

2005 manga
2009 anime television series debuts
Anime series based on manga
Baseball in anime and manga
Coming-of-age anime and manga
Mitsuru Adachi
Romantic comedy anime and manga
Shogakukan manga
Shōnen manga
TV Tokyo original programming
Viz Media anime
Viz Media manga
Winners of the Shogakukan Manga Award for shōnen manga